The following lists events that happened during  2022 in the Caribbean.

Sovereign states

Cuba 

 First Secretary of the Central Committee of the Communist Party of Cuba: Miguel Díaz-Canel (since 19 April 2021)
 President of Cuba: Miguel Díaz-Canel (since 2019)
 Vice-president: Salvador Valdés Mesa (since 2019)
 Prime Minister: Manuel Marrero Cruz (since 2019)

Dominica 

 President: Charles Savarin (since 2013)
 Prime Minister: Roosevelt Skerrit (since August 8, 2004)

Dominican Republic 

 President of the Dominican Republic: Luis Abinader (starting 2020)
 Vice-president Raquel Peña de Antuña (starting 2020)

Haiti 

 President of Haiti: Ariel Henry
 Acting Prime Minister: Ariel Henry

Trinidad and Tobago 

 President of Trinidad and Tobago: Paula-Mae Weekes (since 2008)
 Prime minister of Trinidad and Tobago: Keith Rowley (since 2015)

Commonwealth Realms 
 Monarch: Queen Elizabeth II (until 8 September) Charles III onwards

Antigua and Barbuda 

 Governor-General of Antigua and Barbuda: Rodney Williams (since 2014)
 Prime Minister: Gaston Browne (since 2014)

The Bahamas 

 The Bahamas are in the Atlantic Ocean and are part of the West Indies, not part of the Caribbean, although the United Nations groups them with the Caribbean

Barbados 

 Barbados became independent from the United Kingdom in 1966

 Governor-General of Barbados: Sandra Mason (since 2018)
 President of Barbados: Sandra Mason (from November 30, 2021)
 Prime minister of Barbados: Mia Mottley (since 2018)

Grenada 

 Governor-General of Grenada: Cécile La Grenade (since 2013)
 Prime Minister: Keith Mitchell (until 24 June) Dickon Mitchell onwards

Jamaica 

 Jamaica became independent in 1962

 Governor-General of Jamaica: Patrick Allen (since 2009)
 Prime Minister of Jamaica: Andrew Holness (since 2016)

Saint Kitts and Nevis 

 Governor-General of Saint Kitts and Nevis: Tapley Seaton (since 2015)
 Prime Minister: Timothy Harris (until 6 August) Terrance Drew onwards

Saint Lucia 

 Governor-General of Saint Lucia: Errol Charles
 Prime Minister: Philip J. Pierre

Saint Vincent and the Grenadines 

 Governor-General of Saint Vincent and the Grenadines: Susan Dougan (since 2019)
 Prime Minister: Ralph Gonsalves (since March 28, 2001)

Dependencies

British overseas territories 
 Head of the Commonwealth: Queen Elizabeth II (until 8 September) Charles III onwards

Anguilla 

 Governor of Anguilla: Dileeni Daniel-Selvaratnam
 Premier of Anguilla: Ellis Webster (since 2020)

Bermuda 

 Bermuda is located in the Atlantic Ocean and is included in the UN geoscheme for North America. 

 Governor of Bermuda: Rena Lalgie
 Premier: Edward David Burt (since 2017)

British Virgin Islands 

 Governor of the Virgin Islands: John Rankin
 Deputy Governor of the British Virgin Islands: David Archer
 Premier: Natalio Wheatley

Cayman Islands 

 Governor of the Cayman Islands: Martyn Roper (since 2018)
 Premier: Wayne Panton

Montserrat 

 Governor of Montserrat: Sarah Tucker
 Premier: Easton Taylor-Farrell (since 2019)

Turks and Caicos Islands 
 Turks and Caicos Islands are located in the Atlantic Ocean, although the United Nations groups them with the Caribbean

 Governor Nigel Dakin (since 2019)
 Premier: 
 Sharlene Cartwright-Robinson (until February 20)
 Washington Misick (starting February 20)

France 

 President: Emmanuel Macron (since 2017)
 Prime Minister: Édouard Philippe (since 2017)

Guadeloupe 

 Governor: Philippe Gustin (since 2018)

Martinique 

 President of the Assembly of Martinique:Claude Lise (since 2015)

Saint Barthélemy 

 President of Territorial Council: Bruno Magras (since July 16, 2007)

Saint Martin 

 Prefect Anne Laubies (since 2015)
 President of Territorial Council Daniel Gibbs (since 2017)
 First Vice President Valerie Damaseua (since 2017)

Kingdom of the Netherlands 

Monarch: King Willem-Alexander (since April 30, 2013)

Aruba 

 Governor of Aruba: Alfonso Boekhoudt (since 2017)
 Prime Minister: Evelyn Wever-Croes (since 2018)

Curaçao 

 Governor of Curaçao: Lucille George-Wout (since 2013)
 Prime Minister: Gilmar Pisas

Sint Maarten 
 Sint Maarten became a self-governing constituent Kingdom of the Netherlands in October 2010.

 Governor of Sint Maarten: Eugene Holiday (since 2010)
 Interim Prime Minister of Sint Maarten: Silveria Jacobs (since 2020)

Caribbean Netherlands 
 Bonaire,  Sint Eustatius, and  Saba

United States 
The 

 President
 Joe Biden
 Vice-president
 Kamala Harris (starting January 20)

Puerto Rico 

 Governor of Puerto Rico
 Pedro Pierluisi (starting January 2)
 Resident Commissioner of Puerto Rico: Jenniffer González (since 2017)

United States Virgin Islands 

 Governor: Albert Bryan (since 2019)
 Lt. Governor: Tregenza Roach (since 2019)

Events

Scheduled and programmed events

Elections 

January 19 – 2022 Barbadian general election
June 23 – 2022 Grenadian general election
August 5 - 2022 Saint Kitts and Nevis general election

Holidays

January and February 

January 1 –New Year's Day
Triumph of the Revolution, Cuba
Independence Day, Haiti (from France, 1804)
January 2
Victory Day, Cuba
Ancestry Day, Haiti
Day after New Year's, Saint Lucia
January 6 – Epiphany, Christian and children's holiday
January 11 – Majority Rule Day, the Bahamas
January 18 – Martin Luther King Jr. Day, official holiday in Puerto Rico and United States Virgin Islands
January 21
Errol Barrow Day, Barbados
Our Lady of High Grace, holiday in the Dominican Republic
January 25 – Juan Pablo Duarte′s Birthday, Dominican Republic 
February 8 – Independence Day (Grenada) (from the UK, 1974)
February 15 – Heroes′ Day, Puerto Rico; President's Day, Puerto Rico and U.S. Virgin Islands
February 15–16 — Carnival Monday and Tuesday.
February 22 – Independence Day, Saint Lucia (from the UK, 1979)
February 27 – Independence Day, Dominican Republic (from Haiti, 1844)

March and April 

March 2 – American Citizenship Day, Puerto Rico
March 15 – Joseph Chatoyer Day, Saint Vincent and the Grenadines
March 22 – Emancipation Day, Puerto Rico
March 31 – Transfer Day, U.S. Virgin Islands.
April 2 – Good Friday, Christian feast celebrated in Cuba, Dominica,
April 5 – Easter Monday, Christian holiday celebrated in Dominica,
April 28 – Barbadian National Heroes Day, Barbados

May and June 

May 1/3 – Labour Day and International Workers' Day
Labour and Agriculture Day, Haiti
May 18 – Flag and Universities Day, Haiti
May 20 – Independence Day (from the United States, 1902), celebrated by Cuban exiles.
May 24
Whit Monday, Christian holiday celebrated in Dominica,
Labour Day (Jamaica)
May 31 – Memorial Day, Puerto Rico and U.S. Virgin Islands
June 3 – Feast of Corpus Christi, celebrated in Dominican Republic, public holiday in Grenada, Haiti Saint Lucia,
June 4 – Randol Fawkes-Labour Day, the Bahamas

July and August 

July 3 – Emancipation Day, U.S. Virgin Islands
July 4 – Independence of the United States, celebrated in Puerto Rico and U.S. Virgin Islands
July 5–6 – Vincy Mas (Carnival), Saint Vincent and the Grenadines
July 10 – Independence Day, the Bahamas (from the UK, 1973)
July 14 – Bastille Day, celebrated in French territories.
July 25–27 – Commemoration of the Assault on the Moncada Barracks, Cuba
August 2
Emancipation Day, Dominica, the Bahamas, Grenada, Jamaica, Saint Vincent and the Grenadines
Kadooment Day, Barbados
August 3
Emancipation Day, Barbados 
Culturama Day, Saint Kitts and Nevis
August 6 – Independence Day (Jamaica) (from the UK, 1962)
August 15 – Assumption of Mary, Roman Catholic feast celebrated in Haiti
August 16 – Restoration Day, Dominican Republic

September and October 

September 6 – Labor Day, Puerto Rico and U.S. Virgin Islands
September 16 – Heroes' Day, Saint Kitts and Nevis
September 20 – Independence Day, Saint Kitts and Nevis (from the UK, 1973)
September 24 – Feast of María de las Mercedes (English: Our Lady of Mercy), celebrated in Dominican Republic 
October 4 – Thanksgiving Day, Saint Lucia
October 10 – Independence Day (from Spain, 1868), Cuba
October 11
National Heroes' Day, the Bahamas,
Columbus Day, Puerto Rico and U.S. Virgin Islands
October 17 – Jean-Jacques Dessalines Day, Haiti
October 18 – Heroes' Day, Jamaica
October 25 – Thanksgiving Day, Grenada
October 27 – Independence Day, Saint Vincent and the Grenadines (from the UK, 1979)

November and December 

 November 1

Independence Day, Antigua and Barbuda (from the UK, 1981)
D. Hamilton Jackson Day, U.S. Virgin Islands
All Saints' Day, Roman Catholic and Vodou holiday in Haiti
All Souls' Day, Roman Catholic and Vodou holiday in Haiti
November 3 – Independence Day, Dominica (from the UK, 1978)
November 4 – National Day of Community Service, Dominica
November 5 – Constitution Day, Dominican Republic  
November 11 – Veterans Day, Puerto Rico and U.S. Virgin Islands
November 18 – Battle of Vertières Day, Haiti
November 19 – Discovery Day, Puerto Rico
November 25 – Thanksgiving (United States), celebrated in Puerto Rico and U.S. Virgin Islands
November 30 – Republic Day, Barbados
December 9 – V.C. Bird Day, Antigua and Barbuda
December 13 – National Day, Saint Lucia (feast of Saint Lucy)
December 25/26/27 – Christmas Day
December 26/27/28 – Boxing Day, celebrated in the Commonwealth and British Dependencies.

Sports 

 2022 Caribbean Premier League

Deaths 

30 April - Ricardo Alarcón, Cuban politician Permanent Representative to the United Nations (born 1937).

See also 

2020s
2022 in politics and government
2020s in political history
2022 Atlantic hurricane season
Caribbean Community
Organization of American States

References 

 
2022 in North America
2022 in South America
Caribbean